The Liechtenstein witch trials took place between 1679 and 1682, after a first trial in 1648–1651. The third trial of 1679–1682 is known more in detail than the first. It led to the death of about 100 people. About as many people of both genders seem to have been executed.

Trials 
The trial was instigated in 1679 by the Governor, Dr Romaricus Prügler von Herkelsberg, in Vaduz. At this point, the ruler of the state, Ferdinand Karl von Hohenems, had acquired large debts and the finances of the state was in a bad condition, which was reduced by the fact that the property of the executed could be confiscated by the crown. After the escape of Maria Eberlin von Planken from Vaduz, the priest Valentin von Kriss vor Ort appeared before the Emperor in Innsbruck and claimed that the witch trials was conducted by unlawful methods. 

The Emperor formed a commission to investigate the matter. In 1682, the commission declared the witch trials to be illegal and ordered them to stop. The Liechtenstein witch trials led to feuds among the families of the accused and the accusers which affected the society of Liechtenstein for a very long period after the trials.  

The first trial of 1648–1651 also led to the execution of about 100 people, the same number as the executed of the 1679–1682 trial, which makes the number of executed from the two big Liechtenstein witch trials to 200 altogether.

References

Literature 
 Seger, Otto: Der letzte Akt im Drama der Hexenprozesse in der Grafschaft Vaduz und der Herrschaft Schellenberg. In: Otto Seger, Peter Putzer: Hexenprozesse in Liechtenstein und das Salzburger Rechtsgutachten von 1682. St. Johann i. P.- Wien 1987 (= Schriften des Instituts für Historische Kriminologie 2), S. 47–114. 
 Tschaikner, Manfred: "Der Teufel und die Hexen müssen aus dem Land ...". Frühneuzeitliche Hexenverfolgungen in Liechtenstein. In: Jahrbuch des Historischen Vereins für das Fürstentum Liechtenstein 96 (1998), S. 1–197.  
 Ders.: Die Feldkircher Jesuiten, das nächtliche Landleben und die Hexenverfolgungen. In: Montfort 51 (1999), S. 337–339.

Witch trials in Europe
History of Liechtenstein
1679 in law
1680 in law
1681 in law
1682 in law